Patrick Robert Carter, Baron Carter of Coles (born 9 February 1946) was chairman of the review panel examining the future of NHS pathology (reported in 2016). He reviewed the procurement of legal aid in England and Wales (reported in 2006), and was chair of Sport England until September 2006. He co-founded private nursing home company Westminster Health Care in 1985 with Martin Bradford.

He was educated at Brentwood School, Essex.

Carter was made a life peer as Baron Carter of Coles, of Westmill in the County of Hertfordshire on the advice of Prime Minister Tony Blair on 8 June 2004.  He takes the Labour whip.

At the request of the Government of the day Carter made significant positive interventions in some of the UK's major sports projects and events. In particular he played a lead role in resolving the funding issues surrounding the hosting of the Manchester 2002 Commonwealth Games, and was the lead facilitator in the resolution of the major financial dispute between Multiplex Construction UK Ltd and Wembley National Stadium Ltd, when the stadium was redeveloped prior to re-opening in 2007.

In his review of NHS spending, Carter argued that the NHS in England could save £5bn a year through better staff organisation and an improved approach to purchasing.

Carter was educated at Brentwood School where he was a contemporary of politician Jack Straw.   In his autobiography Straw describes Carter as his closest friend. (Last Man Standing  p49)

Carter was president of McKesson corporation's International Operations Group and was responsible for the businesses' product portfolio.

He was reckoned by the Health Service Journal to be the ninth most influential person in the English NHS in 2015.

He chairs the board of Health Services Laboratories.

References

External links
Lord Carter's Review of Legal Aid Procurement
Lord Carter's bio on the Official House of Lords website
Lord Carter of Coles entry on TheyWorkForYou

Carter, Patrick Robert
People educated at Brentwood School, Essex
Carter, Patrick Robert
Carter of Coles, Patrick Carter, Baron
Alumni of Hatfield College, Durham
Life peers created by Elizabeth II